Zak William Seddon (born 28 June 1994) is an English runner specialising in the 3000 metres steeplechase. He competed for Great Britain but didn't make the finals of the 2017 World Championships. he won a gold medal at the 2013 European Junior Championships.

International competitions

Personal bests

Outdoor
1500 metres – 3:42.02 (Walnut 2015)
One mile – 3:58.90 (London 2019)
3000 metres – 8:08.61 (London 2012)
5000 metres – 00:14:51 (Portsmouth 2022)
2000 metres steeplechase – 5:36.19 (Solihull 2017)
3000 metres steeplechase – 8:21.28 (Rome 2019)

Indoor
One mile – 4:04.03 (Boston 2016)
3000 metres – 7:58.95 (Sheffield 2017)

References

1994 births
Living people
English male steeplechase runners
British male steeplechase runners
Athletes (track and field) at the 2010 Summer Youth Olympics
Competitors at the 2017 Summer Universiade
World Athletics Championships athletes for Great Britain
British Athletics Championships winners
English expatriates in the United States
Olympic athletes of Great Britain
Athletes (track and field) at the 2020 Summer Olympics